The following is a list of countries to which Uruguay has provided ambassadors, with their respective incumbents (in 2013).

References

External links 
 Uruguayan embassies in the world 

 
 
Uruguay